Jamal Mixon (born June 17, 1983) is an American comedy actor. He is best known for his role as Ernie Klump Jr. in the film The Nutty Professor, and its sequel, Nutty Professor II: The Klumps. He is the younger brother of actor Jerod Mixon.

Career
Mixon's other acting credits include the television series Malcolm & Eddie, Moesha, The Parkers, Good News, The Proud Family and George Lopez. He also appeared in the films Def Jam's How to Be a Player (1997), Bulworth (1998), House Party 4: Down to the Last Minute (2001), The Cookout (2004), Gridiron Gang (2006), Paul Blart: Mall Cop (2009), Steppin: The Movie (2009), and White T (2013).

Filmography

Film

Television

References

External links

1983 births
Living people
21st-century American male actors
American male child actors
American male film actors
American male television actors
People from Oxnard, California